Zachary Edward Snyder (born March 1, 1966) is an American film director, producer, screenwriter, and cinematographer. He made his feature film debut in 2004 with Dawn of the Dead, a remake of the 1978 horror film of the same name. Since then, he has directed or produced a number of comic book and superhero films, including 300 (2007) and Watchmen (2009), as well as the Superman film that started the DC Extended Universe, Man of Steel (2013), and its follow-ups, Batman v Superman: Dawn of Justice (2016) and Justice League (2017). A director's cut for Justice League was released in 2021. He also directed the computer-animated film Legend of the Guardians: The Owls of Ga'Hoole (2010), the psychological action film Sucker Punch (2011), the zombie heist film Army of the Dead (2021), and the space opera film Rebel Moon (2023).

In 2004, he founded the production company The Stone Quarry (formerly known as Cruel and Unusual Films) alongside his wife Deborah Snyder and producing partner Wesley Coller.

Early life 
Snyder was born in Green Bay, Wisconsin, and raised in Riverside, Connecticut. His mother, Marsha Manley (née Reeves; d. 2010), was a painter and a photography teacher at Daycroft School, which Snyder later attended. His father, Charles Edward "Ed" Snyder, worked as an executive recruiter. He has an older sister, Audrey, and was raised as a Christian Scientist. He also had a brother, Sam, who died when Snyder was a teenager.

Snyder attended Camp Owatonna in Harrison, Maine, during the summer months as a child. Snyder studied painting a year after high school at Heatherley School of Fine Art in England, although he had already begun filmmaking. Afterward, Snyder attended Art Center College of Design in Pasadena, California. He graduated with a BFA in film in 1989.

The production notes for Snyder's first film Dawn of the Dead describes Snyder as "a comic book and horror film enthusiast in his youth".

Career 
Snyder made his feature film debut with the remake of the horror film Dawn of the Dead (2004), and scored a box office hit with the fantasy war film 300 (2006), adapted from writer-artist Frank Miller's Dark Horse Comics miniseries of the same name. His Warner Bros. film Watchmen was released on March 6, 2009, and grossed $185 million worldwide. His follow-up project/animation debut, Legend of the Guardians: The Owls of Ga'Hoole, was released on September 24, 2010. Snyder produced, co-wrote, and directed Sucker Punch, which was released on March 25, 2011. The film, based on a script written by Snyder and Steve Shibuya, was about a young woman in a mental hospital who fantasizes of escape with her fellow inmates.

He directed 2013's Man of Steel for Warner Bros., a reboot of the Superman franchise and the jumpstart to the DC Extended Universe (DCEU) and produced the prequel/sequel to 300, 300: Rise of an Empire (2014).

During Comic Con 2013, Snyder announced that Batman and Superman would share the screen in Batman v Superman: Dawn of Justice, released in 2016. Snyder directed, Cavill reprised his role as Superman, and Ben Affleck played Batman. Snyder directed Warner Bros.' 2017 Justice League, but he exited during post-production to deal with the death of his daughter, Autumn Snyder. His replacement was Joss Whedon.

On January 29, 2019, Snyder announced that he had signed on to helm Army of the Dead, a zombie heist thriller, for Netflix. Snyder directed and produced the film with his partner and wife, Deborah Snyder, via their newly rebranded production company, The Stone Quarry. His agreement with Netflix has since expanded into several Army of the Dead projects; Army of Thieves, a prequel released in 2021, and Planet of the Dead, a sequel to be created.

On May 20, 2020, Snyder announced that Zack Snyder's Justice League would be released on the streaming service HBO Max in 2021. The film was released on March 18, 2021.

Future and potential projects 
In July 2021, Snyder was officially announced to be developing the film Rebel Moon for Netflix. It will be inspired by Star Wars and the films of Akira Kurosawa. Filming began in April 2022 and will last until November that year, with the project being developed as a two-part film.

As of May 2021, Snyder was working on Horse Latitudes, formerly known as The Last Photograph, a drama about a war photographer in South America.  He was also working on an adaptation of the 1943 novel The Fountainhead by Ayn Rand, but confirmed he had abandoned it in 2021 due to political reasons. He has also expressed an interest in making a film, in the style of 300, about George Washington.

Snyder will produce Twilight of the Gods, an anime-style web series inspired by Norse mythology for Netflix. Snyder is also developing a King Arthur film, which he said will be a "faithful retelling". It will be set during the American Gold rush era.

Following Rebel Moon, Snyder will return to direct Planet of the Dead, a sequel to Army of the Dead. He also signed a first-look deal with Netflix.

Filmmaking

Style 
Snyder often uses slow motion, particularly the technique of speed ramping, in and out of the fight scenes in his films, differing from other directors who make multiple cuts and close-ups during a fight. A minute-long shot from 300 shows King Leonidas slaughtering his enemies, the camera zooming in and out to emphasize each kill and move Leonidas makes.

Snyder said "There are other superhero movies where they joke about how basically no one's getting hurt. That's not us. What is that message? That it's okay that there's this massive destruction with zero consequence for anyone? That's what Watchmen was about in a lot of ways too. There was a scene, that scene where Dan and Laurie get mugged. They beat up the criminals. I was like the first guy, I want to show his arm get broken. I want a compound fracture. I don't want it to be clean. I want you to go, 'Oh my God, I guess you're right. If you just beat up a guy in an alley he's not going to just be lying on the ground. It's going to be messy'."

The Netflix production Army of the Dead was a special project for Snyder as he served as his own cinematographer, as well as this being his first film shot digitally.

Reception 
Snyder has been described as one of the most polarizing directors of modern cinema. David Ehrlich of IndieWire wrote that Snyder's "name alone is enough to launch a thousand angry tweets, and the most passionate writing about his work is exclusively found in the comment sections of websites like this one. Snyder's critics really seem to hate him, and Snyder's fans really seem to hate his critics ... Is Snyder a master or a hack? A misunderstood myth-maker, or a meathead with a movie camera?" Film critic Armond White has listed Snyder as one of the four best filmmakers of the 2010's. Director James Cameron has cited Snyder as an inspiration, praising his "cinematic language".

Personal life 
In 2009, Snyder listed Excalibur, Mad Max 2, A Clockwork Orange, Blue Velvet, and RoboCop as his five favorite films.

Family 
Snyder lives in Pasadena, California with his second wife, producer Deborah Johnson. The couple first met in 1996, began dating in 2002, and married on September 25, 2004, at St. Bartholomew's Episcopal Church in Manhattan, New York. He was previously married to Denise Weber.

Snyder has eight children: two biological children and two adopted daughters with Weber, two biological sons from a relationship with Kirsten Elin, and two adopted children with Johnson. The suicide of his daughter Autumn prompted Snyder to withdraw from post-production work on Justice League in May 2017 to be with his family, which resulted in Joss Whedon completing the film in his place.

Philanthropy 
Following his daughter's suicide, Snyder became involved in philanthropic activities directed towards suicide prevention and mental health awareness. Snyder promoted this effort on social media by selling clothing and merchandise related to the Snyder Cut; in May 2021, it was revealed that this effort had raised more than $750,000 in charitable donations to the American Foundation for Suicide Prevention.

In another effort to help with suicide prevention, Snyder included a billboard for the American Foundation for Suicide Prevention with the message "You are not alone" in a scene in Zack Snyder's Justice League. The film features other tributes to his late daughter.

Snyder directed 2 PSAs for the Leukemia & Lymphoma Society in 2018.

In 2021, Snyder partnered with Save the Children, a global child rights organization, to build a 100-bed temporary hospital facility in Delhi to help fight the COVID-19 pandemic in India.

Political views 
Although his films have been accused of having right-wing messages, politically, Snyder is a Democrat. He endorsed Joe Biden in the 2020 presidential election. In a 2021 interview with The Guardian, he stated:I vote Democrat! I’m a true lover of individual rights. I’ve always been a super-strong advocate of women’s rights and a woman’s right to choose, and I’ve always been surrounded by powerful women. And, of course, I’m a huge advocate for the rights of all ethnicities and every walk of life. I would say I’m a pretty liberal guy. I want to make sure everyone’s heard and everyone feels included. I don’t have a rightwing political agenda. People see what they want to see. For me, that was not certainly the point.

Filmography

Films 

Executive producer

Short films

Music videos

Television

Awards and nominations 
Snyder's body of work has earned him a number of awards, including two Clio Awards and a Gold Lion Award for his Jeep "Frisbee" commercial. He also won the Society of British Advertisers Award for Humor for his controversial EB Beer commercial "General's Party".

Notes

References

External links 

 Cruel and Unusual Films – Snyder's production company
 
 

1966 births
Living people
Action film directors
American Christian Scientists
American feminists
Advertising directors
American male screenwriters
American music video directors
People from Green Bay, Wisconsin
People from Riverside, Connecticut
Connecticut Democrats
Science fiction film directors
Writers from Greenwich, Connecticut
Film directors from Connecticut
Hugo Award-winning writers
Film directors from Wisconsin
Screenwriters from Wisconsin
Screenwriters from Connecticut
Film producers from Wisconsin
Film producers from Connecticut